Carlos Torres Vila (born 24 February 1966) is a Spanish banker, who has been CEO of Banco Bilbao Vizcaya Argentaria (BBVA) since May 2015, and executive chairman since December 2018.

Education
Torres Vila completed his undergraduate degree in electrical engineering and business at the Massachusetts Institute of Technology and earned an MBA from the Sloan School of Management at the same university. Torres Vila also holds a law degree from the UNED.

Professional career
Torres Vila began his professional career at the consulting firm McKinsey & Company, where he became partner in 1997.

Torres Vila was later recruited by Endesa as director of strategy and corporate development, where he was subsequently appointed a member of the steering committee and director of finance/CFO.

In September 2008, Torres Vila joined the Banco Bilbao Vizcaya Argentaria as director of corporate strategy and development and a member of its management committee.

In March 2014 Torres Vila was appointed as digital banking director, a position that he held until May 2015, when he replaced his predecessor Ángel Cano as president and COO of BBVA in order to accelerate the transformation of the bank.

Other activities

Corporate boards
 Banco Bilbao Vizcaya Argentaria, Member of the Board of Directors
 Garanti BBVA, Member of the Board of Directors

Non-profit organizations
 Endeavor España, Member of the Board of Trustees 
 Fundación BBVA, Chairman of the Board
 Institute of International Finance, Member of the Board of Directors
 European Financial Services Roundtable (EFR), Member
 Elcano Royal Institute, Member of the Board of Trustees 
 Fundación de Ayuda contra la Drogadicción, Member of the Board of Trustees

References

1966 births
Spanish bankers
MIT School of Engineering alumni
MIT Sloan School of Management alumni
Living people